Maira Shamsutdinova (6 May 1890 – 25 January 1927) was a Soviet/Kazakh singer and composer. There is a museum in her native Pavlodar dedicated to her.

References 

1890 births
1927 deaths
20th-century Kazakhstani women singers
People from Pavlodar
Kazakhstani composers
Soviet women composers
Soviet women singers
20th-century women composers